An Oxford University Chest is a book about the University of Oxford, written by the poet Sir John Betjeman and first published by John Miles in London in 1938. The full title is An Oxford University Chest. Comprising a Description of the Present State of the Town and University of Oxford with an itinerary arranged alphabetically.

The book includes photographs by László Moholy-Nagy and illustrations by Osbert Lancaster and by Edward Bradley, the latter reproduced from the Victorian novel The Adventures of Mr. Verdant Green.

The title is a pun on the University Chest, the financial treasury of the university.  The book provides glimpses into the life and characteristics of the university.

A paperback edition was issued by Oxford University Press in 1979.

References 

1938 non-fiction books
English non-fiction books
Culture of the University of Oxford
British travel books
Books by John Betjeman
Books about Oxford